Mount Ruth Gade is a pyramidal mountain, 3,515 m, standing 3 nautical miles (6 km) northeast of Mount Wedel-Jarlsberg in the Quarles Range, Queen Maud Mountains. Discovered in November 1911 by Captain Roald Amundsen, and named by him for Ruth Sibley Gade, born in Rochester, New York. Her husband, architect John Gade, made a substantial contribution to Amundsen's expedition and he repaid his generosity by honoring Mrs. Gade with this tribute.

Further reading 
  Roland Huntford, Race for the South Pole: The Expedition Diaries of Scott and Amundsen, P 135
 United States. Defense Mapping Agency. Hydrographic Center, Sailing Directions for Antarctica: Including the Off-lying Islands South of Latitude 60°, P 215

External links 

 Mount Ruth Gade on USGS website
 Mount Ruth Gade on the Antarctica New Zealand Digital Asset Manager website
 Mount Ruth Gade on SCAR website
 Mount Ruth Gade on peakbagger
 Mount Ruth Gade on peakery

References 

Mountains of the Ross Dependency
Amundsen Coast